The decade of the 1680s in archaeology involved some significant events.

Explorations

Excavations
 1685: Dolmen at Borger, Netherlands, excavated by Titia Brongersma.

Finds

Publications
 1685: Jacob Spon - Miscellanea eruditae antiquitatis

Events
 1683: June 6 - The Ashmolean Museum opens in Oxford. The Rev. Robert Huntington donates the limestone false door stele of Shery from Saqqara (Fourth Dynasty of Egypt), one of the first large Middle Eastern sculptures seen in Western Europe.
 1687: An explosion destroys part of the Parthenon.

Births
 1685: approximate date - John Horsley, English archaeologist (d. 1732)
 1687: November 7 - William Stukeley, English antiquarian (d. 1765)

Deaths
 1680: November 28 - Athanasius Kircher, German scholar (b. 1602)
 1689: November 26 - Marquard Gude, German archaeologist (b. 1635)

References

Archaeology by decade
Archaeology